The 1983–84 Louisville Cardinals men's basketball team represented the University of Louisville during the 1983–84 NCAA Division I men's basketball season, Louisville's 71st season of intercollegiate competition. The Cardinals competed in the Metro Conference and were coached by Denny Crum, who was in his thirteenth season.  The team played its home games at Freedom Hall.

The Cardinals won the Metro Conference regular season (their 6th).  They earned a 5 seed in the NCAA Midwest Regional where they lost to Kentucky 72–71 in the Sweet Sixteen. The Cardinals finished with a 24–11 (11–3) record.

Roster

Schedule

NCAA tournament

Mideast region

References

Louisville Cardinals men's basketball seasons
Louisville
Louisville
Louisville Cardinals men's basketball, 1983-84
Louisville Cardinals men's basketball, 1983-84